Sous le Vent is a parish of Saint Barthélemy in the Caribbean.

References 

Populated places in Saint Barthélemy